The Santa María River (Panama) is a river of Panama. The river runs approximately 148 kilometers. The Santa María River's headwaters are located in the district of Santa Fe, Veraguas. The mouth of the river is in the Gulf of Parita in Panama's Herrera Province.

See also
List of rivers of Panama

References

 Rand McNally, The New International Atlas, 1993.
CIA map, 1995.

Rivers of Panama